Blymhill is a village and former civil parish, now in the parish of Blymhill and Weston-under-Lizard, in the South Staffordshire district, in the county of Staffordshire, England. It has a church called St Mary's Church. In 1961 the parish had a population of 459. On 1 April 1986 the parish was abolished and merged with Weston-under-Lizard to form "Blymhill and Weston-under-Lizard".

See also
 Listed buildings in Blymhill and Weston-under-Lizard
 White Sitch

References

External links

Villages in Staffordshire
Former civil parishes in Staffordshire
South Staffordshire District